Bəcirəvan (also, Bacirəvan, Badzhiravan, and Bodzherevan) is a village and municipality in the Imishli Rayon of Azerbaijan.  It has a population of 2,137.

References 

Populated places in Imishli District